Pharambara splendida is a moth of the family Thyrididae first described by Arthur Gardiner Butler in 1887. It is found in India, Sri Lanka, Malaysia, Samoa, Taiwan, Sumatra and Australia.

Its larval host plant is Macaranga tanarius.

References

Moths of Asia
Moths described in 1887
Thyrididae